Ange Capuozzo (born 30 April 1999) is a French-born professional rugby union player who plays as a full-back or a wing for French Top 14 club Toulouse and the Italy national team.

Born and raised in France, Capuozzo qualified for Italy through his paternal grandparents. He began his career at Grenoble before signing for Toulouse in 2022. He made his senior debut for Italy against Scotland during the 2022 Six Nations Championship after previously being called up to the Italy U20 and Italy A teams.

Early life
Ange Capuozzo was born on 30 April 1999 in Le Pont-de-Claix, in the outskirts of Grenoble, France to French parents. His father is of Italian descent; Capuozzo's paternal grandparents being from the Naples area and arriving in Isère after World War II when they were children. His maternal grandfather is Malagasy while his maternal grandmother is French. 

Capuozzo grew up and started playing rugby in his hometown. In 2010, he joined professional club Grenoble youth system.

Club career

Grenoble
On 18 May 2019, Capuozzo made his senior debut with Grenoble in an away game at Pau, playing his only game of the 2018–19 Top 14 season. On 6 December, he scored his first try in a home win against Rouen in the 2019–20 Pro D2 season.

In the 2020–21 Pro D2 season, he scored 10 tries in 21 games and finished as the league's top tryscorer.

Toulouse
On 13 May 2022, Capuozzo signed for Toulouse on a three-year contract. On 11 September, he made his club debut in a 28–8 home win against Toulon. Two weeks later, he scored his first try for Toulouse in a home win against Racing 92, playing as a wing.

On 29 January 2023, he scored his first brace against Top 14 defending champions Montpellier.

International career
Born in France to French parents, Capuozzo was eligible to represent France at international level but chose to play for Italy, qualifying through his paternal grandparents. In 2019, he was called up to the Italy U20 squad for the 2019 World Rugby Under 20 Championship, and finished the competition with 2 tries in 5 games.

On 14 October 2021, he was called up to the Italy A national team by Fabio Roselli for the 2021 end-of-year rugby union internationals.

On 24 January 2022, Capuozzo was called up to the Italy national team by Kieran Crowley for the 2022 Six Nations Championship. On 12 March, he scored a brace against Scotland in only 35 minutes for his senior debut. One week later, he was Italy starting full-back against Wales and played the whole eighty minutes. In the closing stages, he made a last-minute run, breaking a tackle before passing to Edoardo Padovani who scored the winning try, sealing Italy's first win against Wales since 2007 and ending a 36-match losing streak in the Six Nations Championship. After the game, Wales wing Josh Adams gave his Player of the Match trophy to Capuozzo as a mark of respect despite being awarded for his performance a bit earlier in the game.

On 28 October, he was called up for the 2022 Autumn internationals. On 12 November, he scored two tries as Italy beat Australia for the first time in Italian rugby history, winning 28-27 in Florence. One week later, he scored another try in a home loss against South Africa in Genoa. The next day, Capuozzo was named 2022 World Rugby Men’s 15s Breakthrough Player of the Year at the World Rugby Awards.

In 2023, he was selected in Italy's Six Nations squad, starting and scoring a try in an opening defeat to France.

International tries

References

External links

1999 births
Living people
French rugby union players
Italian rugby union players
FC Grenoble players
Stade Toulousain players
Sportspeople from Grenoble
Rugby union fullbacks
French sportspeople of Malagasy descent
French sportspeople of Italian descent
Italian people of Malagasy descent